Mick Goodrick (June 9, 1945 – November 16, 2022) was an American jazz guitarist who spent most of his career as a teacher. In the early 1970s, he worked with Gary Burton and Pat Metheny.

Biography
An Elvis fan, Goodrick began studying guitar in his pre-teens and was performing professionally a few years later. When he was sixteen, he became interested in jazz at a Stan Kenton Band Camp. He attended the Berklee School of Music from 1963–1967. He taught at Berklee, then spent a few years touring with Gary Burton. After returning to Boston, he settled into a career largely as an educator.

Goodrick has had many notable students, including Bill Frisell, Julian Lage, John Scofield, Lage Lund, Mike Stern, Avner Strauss, and Rale Micic. His first book, The Advancing Guitarist, is an instruction manual for guitarists of all styles. He has also written a series of books addressing the intricacies of harmonic voice leading.

Goodrick worked with Charlie Haden's Liberation Music Orchestra during the 1980s and early 1990s, with Jack DeJohnette in the late 1980s, and with Steve Swallow in the late 1990s. He performed in a duo with Pat Metheny at the Montreal Jazz Festival in 2005 and with Wolfgang Muthspiel at the Jazz Standard in 2008.

Goodrick died from the long-term effects of Parkinson's disease on November 16, 2022, at the age of 77.

Discography

As leader or co-leader
 In Pas(s)ing (ECM, 1979)
 Biorhythms (CMP, 1990)
 Rare Birds with Joe Diorio (RAM, 1993)
 Sunscreams (RAM, 1994)
 In the Same Breath (CMP, 1996)
 Noisy Old Men (Jam, 2002) with John Abercrombie, Steve Swallow, Gary Chaffee

As sideman
With Gary Burton
 The New Quartet (ECM, 1973)
 Ring (ECM, 1974)
 Seven Songs for Quartet and Chamber Orchestra (ECM, 1974)
 In the Public Interest (Polydor, 1974)
 Dreams So Real (ECM, 1976)

With Jack DeJohnette
 Sorcery (Prestige, 1974)
 Irresistible Forces (Impulse!, 1987)
 Audio-Visualscapes (Impulse!, 1988)

With Claudio Fasoli
 Bodies (Innowo, 1990)
 Cities (RAM, 1993)
 Ten Tributes (RAM, 1995)
 Trois Trios (Splasc(H), 1999)

With Charlie Haden
 The Ballad of the Fallen (ECM, 1983)
 Dream Keeper (DIW, 1990)
 The Montreal Tapes: Liberation Music Orchestra (Verve, 1999)

With others
 Jerry Bergonzi, On Again (RAM, 1998)
 Con Brio, Con Brio (Plug, 1983)
 Con Brio, The Ray (Not Fat, 1987)
 Hal Crook, Hero Worship (RAM, 1997)
 Pino Daniele, Un Uomo in Blues (CGD, 1990)
 Pino Daniele, Sotto 'O Sole (CGD, 1991)
 Dominique Eade, The Long Way Home (RCA Victor, 1999)
 Aydin Esen, Pictures (Bellaphon, 1989)
 Laszlo Gardony, Breakout (Avenue Jazz, 1994)
 Michael Gibbs, In the Public Interest (Polydor, 1974)
 Woody Herman, Woody (Cadet, 1970)
 Jim Hall, Live at Town Hall (Musicmasters, 1991)
 Charlie Mariano, Somewhere, Out there (New Edition 2013)
 Wolfgang Muthspiel, Live at the Jazz Standard (Material, 2010)
 Mika Pohjola, Myths & Beliefs (GM, 1996)
 Bruno Raberg, Chrysalis (OrbisMusic, 2004)
 Steve Swallow, Deconstructed (Xtra Watt, 1997)
 Steve Swallow, Always Pack Your Uniform on Top (Xtra Watt, 2000)
 Harvie Swartz, In a Different Light (Bluemoon, 1990)
 Harvie Swartz, Arrival (RCA 1992)
 Gary Thomas, By Any Means Necessary (JMT, 1989)
 Dan Wall, On the Inside Looking In (Double-Time, 2000)

Selected books

References

External links
 Berklee faculty biography
 

1945 births
2022 deaths 
Deaths from Parkinson's disease
Berklee College of Music alumni
Berklee College of Music faculty
Guitarists from Pennsylvania
20th-century American guitarists
21st-century American guitarists
American jazz guitarists
People from Sharon, Pennsylvania
Jazz musicians from Pennsylvania